Gyroidina is a genus of foraminifera belonging to the family Gavelinellidae of the superfamily Chilostomelloidea and the order Rotaliida. Its temporal range is the Holocene.

Species
Species in Gyroidina include:

 †Gyroidina aegyptiaca
 †Gyroidina akkeshiensis
 †Gyroidina alabamensis
 †Gyroidina alticamerata
 Gyroidina altiformis
 †Gyroidina angustiumbilicata
 †Gyroidina anomalinoides
 Gyroidina antarctica
 †Gyroidina arkadelphiana
 Gyroidina asymmetrica
 †Gyroidina babicensis
 †Gyroidina barbarica
 †Gyroidina basicrassata
 †Gyroidina beisseli
 †Gyroidina borislavensis
 †Gyroidina brockerti
 †Gyroidina bukalovae
 †Gyroidina byramensis
 Gyroidina carinata
 Gyroidina carmenensi
 †Gyroidina cetera
 Gyroidina chathamensis
 †Gyroidina childsi
 †Gyroidina chirana
 †Gyroidina cibaoensis
 †Gyroidina clodiusi
 Gyroidina colombiaensis
 †Gyroidina comma
 †Gyroidina complanata
 †Gyroidina condoni
 †Gyroidina conica
 Gyroidina contecta
 †Gyroidina cretosa
 †Gyroidina crystalriverensis
 Gyroidina cushmani
 †Gyroidina delicata
 †Gyroidina depressa
 †Gyroidina depressaeformis
 †Gyroidina dissimilis
 †Gyroidina eggeri
 †Gyroidina elongata
 †Gyroidina exserta
 Gyroidina flavescens
 Gyroidina gemma
 †Gyroidina gothica
 Gyroidina guadalupensis
 †Gyroidina guayabalensis
 †Gyroidina hamiltoni
 †Gyroidina hangukensis
 †Gyroidina infrafosa
 Gyroidina io
 †Gyroidina iojimaensis
 †Gyroidina jarvisi
 †Gyroidina jenkinsi
 †Gyroidina kasahstanica
 Gyroidina kawagatai
 †Gyroidina kazusaense
 †Gyroidina keenani
 †Gyroidina komatsui
 †Gyroidina laciniata
 Gyroidina laevigata
 Gyroidina lamarckiana
 Gyroidina lenticularis
 †Gyroidina limbata
 †Gyroidina loetterlei
 Gyroidina longispira
 †Gyroidina lottensis
 †Gyroidina madrugaensis
 †Gyroidina marina
 †Gyroidina marylandica
 †Gyroidina maudryae
 †Gyroidina mauretanica
 Gyroidina mauryae
 †Gyroidina medicea
 †Gyroidina mendezensis
 †Gyroidina minuta
 †Gyroidina moskvini
 †Gyroidina nana
 †Gyroidina nassauensis
 Gyroidina neorotunda
 Gyroidina neosoldanii
 †Gyroidina nitidaformis
 Gyroidina nitidula
 †Gyroidina noda
 †Gyroidina obesa
 †Gyroidina octocamerata
 Gyroidina orbicularis
 †Gyroidina parva
 †Gyroidina patagonica
 Gyroidina pilasensis
 †Gyroidina planulata
 Gyroidina polia
 Gyroidina politula
 †Gyroidina praeglobosa
 †Gyroidina praemegastoma
 †Gyroidina profunda
 †Gyroidina pudica
 †Gyroidina punctata
 Gyroidina quinqueloba
 †Gyroidina relizana
 †Gyroidina reussi
 Gyroidina rothwelli
 †Gyroidina rotunda
 †Gyroidina sakasegawaensis
 †Gyroidina scalata
 †Gyroidina scita
 †Gyroidina simiensis
 †Gyroidina sokolovae
 †Gyroidina sparksi
 †Gyroidina springfieldensis
 †Gyroidina stellifera
 Gyroidina subplanulata
 Gyroidina subsoldanii
 †Gyroidina suturalis
 †Gyroidina tainanensis
 †Gyroidina tayyabi
 †Gyroidina tendami
 †Gyroidina tokachiensis
 †Gyroidina torulus
 †Gyroidina tricherasensis
 Gyroidina tropica
 †Gyroidina tsablensis
 †Gyroidina turgida
 Gyroidina umbilicata
 Gyroidina umbonata
 †Gyroidina urahoroensis
 †Gyroidina vicksburgensis
 †Gyroidina vortex
 †Gyroidina wellmani
 †Gyroidina wengeri

Several species that were formerly in Gyroidina have been placed in the genus Gyroidinoides.

References

Rotaliida genera